The Kasbah of Béja is a historical citadel in the Tunisian city Béja, the Kasbah was built in the 2nd century BC and still exists till today which makes it one of oldest citadels in the region.

Location 

The Kasbah was built on the top of a hill of 305 meters in northern Béja, and this site was chosen so the castle can overlook the city and its surrounding plains and countryside.

History

Antiquity and Middle Ages 

The first citadel of Béja was built in 2nd century BC by the Carthaginians, at that time Béja was called Vaga and was an important agriculture town so Carthage needed to protect specially from barbarian raids, but after the decline of the Carthaginian power, specially after the third Punic war, the city fell under the influence of the Numidians and their king Jugurtha made the fortress his center of reign. 

In 109 BC the Romans took power over the castle and then destroyed it. In 14 BC the Romans rebuilt the fort and improved it adding a garrison, walls and 22 towers.

The fort was once again razed to the ground by the Vandals during the Vandal invasion of North Africa, and the building only raised again by the Byzantines after the Vandalic War, when the Byzantine emperor Justinian I ordered Count Paulos to reconstruct the castle.  

The expansion of the fort continued after the Muslim conquest of the Maghreb where the new Muslim rulers of the country gave it the name "Kasbah" and made it the official center of their representatives of the northern-region. The expansion continued during the rule of the Aghlabids. In 943 the Kasbah suffered major damage when Béja was sacked by the Kharijite rebels led by Abu Yazid, and was restored by the Fatimid Caliph al-Mansur bi-Nasr Allah in 946.

Early modern and modern era 

In the 16th century, during the reign of Ahmed III, the Kasbah was fortified by adding 14 canons to the fort.  

The Ottomans too contributed to the expansion of the citadel by establishing a flanking tower that protected the southern parts of the Kasbah and Janissary garrison, and in 1677 the Tunisian monarch Ali I Bey supported the garrison by a battalion of 500 Spahis.

After the French occupation of Tunisia in 1881, the Kasbah become a Gendarmerie barracks from September 21, 1888 till the independence of the country in 1957.

Current use 

After the independence of Tunisia from France, the fortress was turned into a cultural center, but today the Kasbah is in bad conditions. Restorations started in 2005 and directed by the Tunisian National Heritage Institute, but it has stopped for lack of funding.

Gallery

References

Béja
Buildings and structures completed in the 2nd century BC
Kasbahs in Tunisia
Ancient Roman buildings and structures in Tunisia
Byzantine forts
Islamic architecture
Castle architecture
Buildings of Justinian I